Ferchichi is an Arabic language surname. Notable people with the surname include:
 Anis Mohamed Youssef Ferchichi (born 1978), German rapper, hip-hop producer, and entrepreneur
 Housem Ferchichi (born 1996), Italian footballer of Tunisian descent

References 

Arabic-language surnames
Surnames of Tunisian origin
Surnames of Algerian origin